Scarlet Gruber (née Fernández, born Caracas, Venezuela), is a Venezuelan actress and dancer. She is a daughter of Astrid Gruber and Los Chamos band member Gabriel Fernández.

Filmography

Film

Television

Music video

Awards and nominations

References

External links 

Venezuelan television actresses
21st-century Venezuelan actresses
Venezuelan female dancers
Living people
Year of birth missing (living people)
Venezuelan telenovela actresses